Samuel Gottlieb Bürde (7 December 1753 – 28 April 1831) was a German poet.

Life 
Born in Breslau, Bürde was born the son of a church servant. In Breslau, he attended the Elisabet-Gymnasium; the headmaster there made Bürde aware of poetry. He studied law in Halle. from 1776 to 1778, he was a teacher at a school in Breslau. Later Bürde travelled through Switzerland and Italy. From 1781, he worked as a chamber secretary in his home town. In 1783, Bürde was appointed secretary of the Polish border commission and in 1795 secretary of the Silesian Ministry of Finance. Eleven years later he became director of the chamber and chancellery. Another nine years later, in 1815, he was a member of the royal court council.

Bürde died in Berlin at the age of 77.

Work 
 Translation of Paradise Lost
 Steil und dornig ist der Pfad, der uns zur Vollendung leitet
 Meines Herzens Freude ist nur die, daß ich nie mich von Jesus scheide
 Uns, die Gebundnen, zu befreien, der Unheilbaren Heil zu sein, ist er herabgekommen
 Wann der Herr einst die Gefangnen ihrer Bande ledig macht, o dann schwinden die vergangnen Leiden wie ein Traum der Nacht
 Wenn der Herr einst die Gefangnen (EG 298)
 Erzählung von einer gesellschaftlichen Reise durch einen Theil der Schweiz und des obern Italiens

Further reading 
 
 
 
 Klaus Danzeglocke: Bürde, Samuel Gottlieb. In Wolfgang Herbst (ed.): Wer ist wer im Gesangbuch? Vandenhoeck & Ruprecht, Göttingen 2001, pp 57 f. (online)

References

External links 

 

German Christian hymnwriters
1753 births
1831 deaths
Writers from Wrocław